Davaasambuugiin Dorjbat (born 19 November 1970) is a Mongolian judoka. He competed in the men's half-middleweight event at the 1992 Summer Olympics.

References

External links
 

1970 births
Living people
Mongolian male judoka
Olympic judoka of Mongolia
Judoka at the 1992 Summer Olympics
Place of birth missing (living people)